Malikpur is a village in Jhajjar district in Haryana state, India.

Postal head office is Matanhail.

Nearby villages
 Paharipur 
 Achhej 
 Dubaldhan 
 Palra 
 Dubal Dhan Bidhan

Demography
As of 2011 India census, Malikpur population was 1736 and the number of houses was 356. Women formed 46.8% of the population. Overall literacy rate was 71.0%, however female literacy rate was only 28.0%.

Villages in Jhajjar district